Matthew Warner House is a historic home located at Lima in Livingston County, New York. It was built about 1806 and is a rectangular two story, five bay wide center hall brick residence with a one-story three bay side wing.  It was remodeled in the 1860s and in the 1920s.  The 1860s remodeling resulted in the picturesque Gothic / Italianate character with the prominent cross cut gable and decorative front verandah.  The house was used as an inn in the early 19th century and as a roadside restaurant in the 1930s.

It was listed on the National Register of Historic Places in 1989.

References

Houses on the National Register of Historic Places in New York (state)
Houses completed in 1806
Houses in Livingston County, New York
National Register of Historic Places in Livingston County, New York